Hydraulic transmission may refer to various transmission methods for transferring engine power to drive wheels, using hydraulic fluid:

 Diesel-hydraulic transmission, used in railway locomotives
 Hydrostatic transmission, using hydraulic motors to convert the fluid energy into rotary propulsion
 Hydraulic drive system#Hydraulic cylinder, using hydraulic rams acting on a swashplate or crank to convert the fluid pressure into rotation
 Hydrokinetic transmission, involving one or more torque converters; commonly used in railway locomotives
 Hydraulic automatic transmissions in automobiles manufactured in the mid 20th century, with trade names such as "Hydromatic"

See also 
 Hydraulic machinery, machinery powered by hydraulic motors/hydraulic transmission
 Hydraulic (disambiguation)